Miguel Ángel Vázquez Bautista (born 6 January 1987) is a Mexican professional boxer who held the IBF lightweight title from 2010 to 2014.

Professional career

Early career
Vázquez made his professional debut on 20 January 2006 against Canelo Álvarez (who was just fifteen years old at the time) in a welterweight bout, losing a four-round split decision. He won his next eighteen bouts before losing a unanimous decision to Timothy Bradley on 27 July 2007, in a bout for the WBC Youth super lightweight title. Bradley would go on to say "I knew the fight was going to be tough—he's Mexican. I give him a lot of credit. He's a good fighter." In June 2008, Vázquez claimed the WBC FECARBOX light welterweight title, defeating veteran Aldo Valtierra by technical knockout after eleven rounds. The local commission later came under criticism by a ringside doctor, as the fight was too one-sided and risked the wellbeing of Valtierra. A rematch against Álvarez was fought on 28 June 2008, this time at light middleweight, in which Vázquez lost a ten-round unanimous decision.

On 17 July 2009, Vázquez won a ten-round split decision over then-undefeated world-ranked prospect Breidis Prescott. Prescott scored a knockdown early on but as the fight went, Vázquez accumulated rounds with his sharper boxing and ultimately got the nod over Prescott.

Lightweight title reign
On 14 August 2010, Vázquez fought Ji-Hoon Kim for the vacant IBF lightweight title. Vázquez beat Kim by unanimous decision to win the world title. His first successful title defense was against Ricardo Dominguez on 27 November 2010. Vázquez won the fight with another wide unanimous decision Vázquez made a second successful defense on 12 March 2011 against then-undefeated Leonardo Zappavigna, defeating him by a wide margin over the twelve-round distance. During the fight, Zappavigna landed a solid overhand right to the champion early, but Vázquez responded by opening up a cut over the challenger's left eye and outboxing him for most of the fight.

Vázquez made his third defense against Ammeth Díaz, scoring a knockdown in round 6 en route to another wide decision win. Vázquez headlined a show on HBO for the first, defeating Marvin Quintero via split decision. Vázquez notched a fifth successful defense against Mercito Gesta, whom he defeated by unanimous decision on the undercard of Manny Pacquiao vs. Juan Manuel Márquez IV.

Vázquez vs. Burns cancellation
On January 14, 2013, it was announced that Vázquez will meet lightweight titleholder Ricky Burns in a unification bout on March 16, the card would take place at Wembley Arena in London. Warren announced that he would reschedule the bout for April 20 because Vázquez suffered a viral infection due to food poisoning. After weeks of rumors about the fight being in doubt it fell apart.

In February 2014, Vázquez decisioned Denis Shafikov on Macau.

During his title reign, Vázquez often was criticised for being a boring fighter, as he focused on controlling the distance and keeping opponents at bay through his footwork and jab, as well as employing "dirty" tactics like headbutts and excessive clinching to outmaneuver his opponents.

On 13 September 2014, Vázquez faced Mickey Bey on the undercard of Floyd Mayweather Jr. vs. Marcos Maidana II. Vázquez lost the IBF title in a split decision, being defeated for the first time since 2008. The judges' scorecards were 119–109 and 115–113 for Bey, and 115-113 for Vázquez. Many ringside observers felt Vázquez had won the fight and criticized the decision, especially the 119–109 by Robert Hoyle.

Later career
Vázquez bounced back with a wide unanimous decision win over Jerry Belmontes. However, in October 2015 he suffered another setback, losing another controversial decision to Argenis Mendez. Vázquez won his next four fights against outmatched journeymen. In September 2017, it was announced that Vázquez would face Josh Taylor for the WBC Silver light welterweight title at the Royal Highland Centre on 11 November. Although Vázquez's style seem to pose problems for Taylor early on, Taylor wore him down as the fight went on. Vázquez went down in round 9 from body shots, and he failed to beat the count. This was Vázquez's first stoppage loss.

In his next more notable fight in the UK, Vazquez faced Ohara Davies. Vazquez lost the fight on a controversial points decision .

On 17 October 2020, Vazquez fought Lewis Ritson for the vacant WBA Inter-Continental light welterweight title. Vazquez boxed beautifully throughout the fight and seemed to be winning most of the rounds. Despite that, two of the referees scored the fight 117-111 and 115–113 in favor of Ritson, while the other referee had it 116-113 for Vazquez, awarding Ritson with a highly controversial split-decision victory. Promoter Eddie Hearn called it a disgrace of a card and terrible for the sport whilst the majority of observers also felt Vazquez won the fight clearly.

Professional boxing record

See also
List of Mexican boxing world champions

References

External links

Miguel Vazquez - Profile, News Archive & Current Rankings at Box.Live

Boxers from Jalisco
Sportspeople from Guadalajara, Jalisco
International Boxing Federation champions
World boxing champions
World lightweight boxing champions
1987 births
Living people
Mexican male boxers
Light-welterweight boxers
Welterweight boxers